Encantador (enchanter; charmer) or Encantadora (enchantress; charmstress) may refer to:

 La Encantadora, DC Comics cosmic entity supervillain
 El Encantador, 2010 Colombian telenovela
 Encantadora (song), 2015 song by Yandel

See also

 La Encantada (disambiguation)
 Encantado (disambiguation)
 Enchanter (disambiguation)
 Enchantress (disambiguation)